Willie Porter Wyatt (born September 27, 1967 in Birmingham, Alabama) was an Arena Football League player who played offensive lineman/defensive lineman for the Detroit Drive in 1993 and the Tampa Bay Storm from 1995–1999, and again in 2001. He wore #55. He also played for the Tampa Bay Buccaneers of the National Football League in 1990.

Wyatt played high school football at Gardendale High School in Gardendale, Alabama.

Wyatt coached high school football as a defensive coordinator at Gardendale High, and was head coach of the wrestling team. Previously he was also the defensive line coach and head wrestling coach at Hueytown High School.

Willie Wyatt was frequently referred to as a father figure by the young men he coached. He, and his wife Annette Wyatt, would refer to many of the young men as “their sons.”

References

1967 births
Living people
American football defensive tackles
Alabama Crimson Tide football players
Detroit Drive players
Orlando Thunder players
Tampa Bay Buccaneers players
Tampa Bay Storm players
Players of American football from Birmingham, Alabama
People from Gardendale, Alabama